Busemann is a German surname. Notable people with the surname include: 

 Adolf Busemann (1901–1986), German-American aerospace engineer, inventor of Busemann's Biplane
 Frank Busemann (born 1975), a German decathlete 
 Herbert Busemann (1905–1994), a German-American mathematician, the author of Busemann's theorem

See also 
 Busemann biplane
 Busemann's theorem
 Busemann function

German-language surnames